American singer-songwriter Taylor Swift has released 57 singles as lead artist, 8 singles as a featured artist, and 40 promotional singles. She had sold over 150 million singles worldwide by December 2016. According to the Recording Industry Association of America (RIAA), Swift's digital singles have achieved 137.5 million certified units, based on sales and on-demand streaming, . With 188 chart entries on the Billboard Hot 100 (including 9 number-ones and 40 top-tens), Swift is the female artist with the most charted songs in the United States.

Swift's first chart appearance on the Billboard Hot 100 was "Tim McGraw", the lead single from her 2006 self-titled debut album. The album's third single, "Our Song", made Swift the youngest person to single-handedly write and sing a number-one song on Hot Country Songs. Her second studio album, Fearless (2008), spawned two international top-ten singles—"Love Story" and "You Belong with Me"—the former was Swift's first number one in Australia. Fearless broke the record for the most tracks (13) peaking in the top 40 of the Billboard Hot 100. Her third studio album, Speak Now, included the US top-ten singles "Mine" and "Back to December". The lead single from Swift's fourth studio album Red (2012), "We Are Never Ever Getting Back Together", was her first number one in the United States and New Zealand. Another Red single, "I Knew You Were Trouble", became an international top-five chart hit.

Swift's fifth studio album, 1989 (2014), spawned three Billboard Hot 100 number-one singles: "Shake It Off", "Blank Space", and "Bad Blood"; the first of which spent nearly six months in the top ten and was certified Diamond by the Recording Industry Association of America (RIAA). Two other singles, "Style" and "Wildest Dreams", peaked within the top ten. "Look What You Made Me Do", the US number-one lead single from her sixth studio album Reputation (2017), was her first number-one single in the United Kingdom. Another Reputation single, "Delicate", reached number one on Billboard airplay charts. Her seventh studio album, Lover (2019), was supported by three Billboard Hot 100 top-ten singles: "Me!", "You Need to Calm Down", and "Lover". With her eighth studio album, Folklore (2020), and its lead single, "Cardigan", Swift became the first artist to debut atop both the Billboard 200 and Hot 100 in the same week and broke the record for the most simultaneous Hot 100 chart debuts (16) by a woman. She scored three further Billboard Hot 100 chart toppers with "Willow" from Evermore (2020), "All Too Well (10 Minute Version)"—the longest song to reach number one in history—from Red (Taylor's Version) (2021), and "Anti-Hero" from Midnights (2022). With Midnights, Swift became the first artist to monopolize the entire top 10 of the Billboard Hot 100. "Anti-Hero" spent eight weeks at number one, marking her longest run at the top.

Besides material for her records, Swift has recorded songs for film soundtracks including her first number-one Canadian single "Today Was a Fairytale" for Valentine's Day (2010), the Billboard Hot 100 top-30 entries "Safe & Sound" featuring the Civil Wars and "Eyes Open" for The Hunger Games (2012), and the international top-five single "I Don't Wanna Live Forever" with Zayn for Fifty Shades Darker (2017).

As lead artist

2000s

2010s

2020s

As featured artist

Promotional singles

Other charted or certified songs

2000s

2010s

2020s

Footnotes

See also
 List of Billboard Hot 100 chart achievements and milestones
 List of artists who have achieved simultaneous number-one single and album in the United States
 List of artists who have achieved simultaneous UK and US number-one hits

References

External links
 Official website
 Taylor Swift at AllMusic
 

Discography
Country music discographies
Pop music discographies
Discographies of American artists